The year 1926 in architecture involved some significant architectural events and new buildings.

Events

 c. February – British General Post Office K2 red telephone box, designed by Giles Gilbert Scott, is introduced, chiefly in the London area.
 April–May – The German Zehner-Ring group of Modernist architects expands to become Der Ring.
 June 7 – While walking along the Gran Via de les Corts Catalanes in Barcelona, Antoni Gaudí is struck by a passing tram and knocked unconscious. Delays in receiving medical treatment contribute to his death in hospital a few days later. On June 12, after a funeral procession through the streets of Barcelona lined by thousands, he is buried in the crypt chapel of his unfinished church of Sagrada Família.
 November 27 – In Williamsburg, Virginia, the restoration of Colonial Williamsburg begins.
 Undated
 The Frankfurt kitchen is designed by Margarete Schütte-Lihotzky for Ernst May's social housing project New Frankfurt in Frankfurt, Germany.
 The Russian avant-garde magazine SA is published for the first time.
 Restoration of the Tudor Owlpen Manor in the Cotswolds of England by Norman Jewson is completed.

Buildings and structures

Buildings opened
 May 13 – Hercilio Luz Bridge, Florianopolis, Brazil, designed by Robinson & Steinman.
 September 13 – Clapham South, Tooting Bec, Tooting Broadway, Colliers Wood, South Wimbledon and Morden tube stations, London, designed by Charles Holden (also Balham, opened December 6).
 November 11 – Northampton War Memorial, designed by Edwin Lutyens, unveiled in England.
 December 4 – Bauhaus Dessau building, designed by Walter Gropius, opened in Dessau, Germany.

Buildings completed
 Dormition of the Theotokos Cathedral, Satu Mare, Romania, designed by Ioan Liteanu
 Mausoleum of Yugoslavian Soldiers in Olomouc, designed by Hubert Aust
 Sacred Heart Cathedral of Harbin, China
 Church of The English Martyrs (Roman Catholic), Reading, Berkshire, England, designed by Wilfred C. Mangan
 Southwestern Bell Building, downtown St. Louis, Missouri, USA, designed by Mauran, Russell & Crowell with I.R. Timlin
 Sourdough Inn, Fort Yukon, Alaska, USA
 Remodeling of Twin Peaks, 102 Bedford Street, Greenwich Village, New York City, USA, by Clifford Reed Daily
 900 Stewart Avenue (Ithaca, New York), USA
 New Ways (house for Wenman Joseph Bassett-Lowke), 508 Wellingborough Road, Northampton, England, designed by Peter Behrens, "a pioneer of modern architecture in Britain"
 Villa Wolf in Gubin, Poland, designed by Ludwig Mies van der Rohe

Awards
 RIBA Royal Gold Medal – Ragnar Ostberg.
 Grand Prix de Rome, architecture: Jean-Baptiste Hourlier.

Births
 21 January – Roger Taillibert, French architect (died 2019)
 8 April – Henry N. Cobb, American architect (died 2020)
 15 April – Norma Merrick Sklarek, African American architect (died 2012)
 22 April – James Stirling, British architect (died 1992)
 18 July – Carlo Aymonino, Italian architect and urban planner (died 2010)
 12 October – César Pelli, Argentine-born architect (died 2019)
 6 December - Rifat Chadirji, Iraqi architect (died 2020)

Deaths
 10 June – Antoni Gaudí, Spanish architect, exponent of Catalan Modernism (born 1852)
 7 July – Fyodor Schechtel, Russian architect, graphic artist and stage designer (born 1859)

References